This is a list of Brazilian films released in 2013.

Highest-grossing
These were the top ten Brazilian films in 2013. The films are ranked according to the public.

January – March

April – June

July – September

See also
2013 in Brazil
2013 in Brazilian television

Notes

References

Lançamento de filmes in AdoroCinema
Calendário de Estreias no Cinema in Omelete
Calendário de estreias nacionais in FilmeB

2013
Films
Brazilian